Tore Vamraak (born 3 December 1980) is a Norwegian economist and politician for the Conservative Party. Having worked in the fields of economy and politics, he was appointed State Secretary from 2013 to 2018, and elected deputy representative to the Storting from the constituency of Akershus for the period 2021–2025.

Career
Born on 3 December 1980, Vamraak graduated as economist from the Norwegian School of Economics in 2000, and has studied further subjects in natural sciences and political science at the University of Oslo. His job assignments include researcher at the Norwegian Defence Research Establishment, trainee and asset manager at the Norges Bank Investment Management, and advisor at the Storting for the Conservative Party.

Taking part in local politics, Vamraak was member of the municipal council of Skedsmo from 2011 to 2013. He was appointed State Secretary in Solberg's Cabinet; first at tne Office of the Prime Minister from 2013 to 2015, and thereafter in the Ministry of Finance from 2015 to 2018. As State Secretary he was responsible for the Government Pension Fund and for financial markets. After ending his assignment as State Secretary, Vamraak was junior partner and associate partner in McKinsey & Company from 2018 to 2020. In 2020 he was appointed as chief economist for Econa, a trade union for business administrators.

He was elected deputy representative to the Storting from the constituency of Akershus for the period 2021–2025, for the Conservative Party. He replaced Jan Tore Sanner in the Storting from 1 to 14 October 2021 while Sanner was government minister.

References

1980 births
Living people
Norwegian economists
Norwegian School of Economics alumni
University of Oslo alumni
Conservative Party (Norway) politicians
Akershus politicians
Deputy members of the Storting